Chondromorpha is a genus of millipedes belonging to the family Paradoxosomatidae.

The species of this genus are found in Southeastern Asia, Central America.

Species:

Chondromorpha atopus 
Chondromorpha clarus 
Chondromorpha granosa 
Chondromorpha granulata 
Chondromorpha indus 
Chondromorpha kaimura 
Chondromorpha kelaarti 
Chondromorpha mammifera 
Chondromorpha severini 
Chondromorpha stadelmanni 
Chondromorpha xanthotricha

References

Paradoxosomatidae